Ammopelmatus nigrocapitatus, the black-headed Jerusalem cricket, is a species of insect in the family Stenopelmatidae. It is endemic to the United States.

Sources

Insects of the United States
Stenopelmatoidea
Insects described in 1969
Taxonomy articles created by Polbot
Taxobox binomials not recognized by IUCN